Intelligent Printer Data Stream (IPDS) is InfoPrint Solution Company's Systems Application Architecture host-to-printer data stream for Advanced Function Presentation subsystems. It provides an attachment-independent interface for controlling and managing all points addressable (APA) printers that allows the presentation of pages containing an architecturally unlimited mixture of different data types, including text, image, graphics, bar code and object container. It is used by a variety of InfoPrint and OEM print servers that drive all points addressable (APA) page printers. Generally these printers are at the medium to high end of the print speed and volume spectrum.

"One of the strengths of IPDS is that independent applications can create source data for each data block. The output of these independent applications is merged at the printer to create an integrated mixed data page."

The IPDS architecture allows for both spooled data and print job management to flow bidirectionally between the print server (or print driver) and the Printer Controller.

Examples of print job management controls are:
 Printer resolution
 Media jam
 Pre- or post-processor exceptions
 Storage usage
 Paper tray capabilities
 Duplexing capabilities

Examples of spooled data can be:
 Positioning Information for locating objects within the page
 Fonts
 Text
 Images
 Bar codes
 Electronic overlays

IPDS data streams are purely used to carry print information and data. This is above the network transport layer (typically TCP/IP or SNA) and the supporting hardware LANs, channels and network controllers.

IPDS carries data and instructions from the print server to the printer in structured fields. The printer controller processes these IPDS commands and returns acknowledgment back to the print server.

Similar to PPDS, IPDS uses binary encoded commands and parameters, but IPDS is not compatible with PPDS.

"IPDS is the 'online' way being used to print AFP (Advanced Function Presentation) documents. They can also be printed using the AFPDS format 'offline'."

Printers
A number of printers support IPDS directly.
 Compuprint—"Heavy Duty IPDS Desktop Matrix Printers in speeds of up to 1100 CPS"
 HP—various printers using a plug-in Flash memory device.
 IBM—IBM no longer manufactures printers.
 Printronix—"IPDS Matrix Line Printers in speeds of 500 LPM, 1000 LPM, 1500 LPM and 2000 LPM"
 Ricoh—"IPDS Matrix Line Printers in speeds of 500 LPM, 1000 LPM, 1500 LPM and 2000 LPM.  Heavy Duty IPDS Desktop Matrix Printers in speeds of up to 1100 CPS"
 Tally-Dascom—Heavy Duty IPDS Desktop Matrix Printers in speeds of up to 1000 CPS
 Zebra—Thermal & Thermal Transfer Printers for Printing Labels and Bar Codes

A number of print servers are available from companies such as MPITech, IPDS Printing Solutions, IOCorp, Xerox, and Microsoft.

See also
MO:DCA, Mixed Object Document Content Architecture

References

External links
Intelligent Printer Data Stream Reference
Ricoh IPDS printers (2013)
IBM IPDS printers (2009)

Advanced Function Presentation
Page description languages
Intelligent Printer Data Stream